Viktor Vasilyevich Marinyuk (born April 10, 1939, Kazavchin, Odessa region, USSR) is an Honored Artist of Ukraine, one of the central figures of Odessa unofficial art.

Biography 
Marinyuk was born on April 10, 1939 in the village of Kazavchin, Odessa region (now Kirovohrad region), Gaivoronsky district.

In 1959 he graduated from the Odessa Automobile and Road Technical School.

In 1967 he graduated from the Odessa Art College named after M. B. Grekov. His teacher was Lyubov Tokareva-Alexandrovich.

Marinyuk was one of the founders of the group of young non-conformist artists, which also included Alexander Anufriev, Vladimir Strelnikov, Valery Basanets. In 1971, their unofficial group exhibition took place in the premise of the Union of Artists, which had a wide resonance in the artistic circles of Odessa.

In 1975-1980 he organized and participated in many unofficial "apartment" exhibitions in Odessa and Moscow.

In 1979 he took part in an exhibition "Contemporary Art from Ukraine" - Munich - London - Paris - New York.

In 1987 Marinyuk became a member of the USSR Union of Artists, later the National Union of Artists of Ukraine.

In 1989 he took part in a group exhibition at the Bavarian State Ministry of Labor (Munich).

In the 1990s he carried out active exhibition activities, participated in and formed the expositions of three international biennials "Impreza" (Ivano-Frankivsk), was a member of the jury.

Since 1991 - an honorary member of the Kyiv-Mohyla Academy.

In 1992, he was one of the founders of the Choven creative association, and in 1998, the Mamai creative association.

On October 10, 2008, Marynyuk was awarded the title of Honored Artist of Ukraine for a significant personal contribution to the development of national fine arts, significant achievements in professional activities and on the occasion of the 70th anniversary of the founding of the National Union of Artists of Ukraine.

Lives and works in Odessa.

Work 
The artist's work is characterized by a synthetic variability of the formal features of the national, renaissance - baroque and modern figurative language. The figurative and abstract images created by him are saturated with bright decorativeness and metaphor. Creator of a number of paintings, mosaics, stained-glass windows in Odessa and other cities.

Collections 
Museum Collections

 Zimmerli Art Museum at Rutgers University (New Jersey, United States)
 Museum of Modern Art of Ukraine (Kyiv, Ukraine)
 National University of Kyiv-Mohyla Academy (Kyiv, Ukraine)
 Odesa Fine Arts Museum (Odessa, Ukraine)
 The Museum of Odessa Modern Art (Odessa, Ukraine)
 Odesa Literature Museum (Odessa, Ukraine)
 Khmelnytskyi Museum of Ukrainian Contemporary Art (Khmelnytskyi, Ukraine)
 Museum of Contemporary Ukrainian Art Korsakiv (Lutsk, Ukraine)

References 

Ukrainian artists
1939 births
Living people